Thee Way Eye See It is the debut mixtape by American rapper CJ Fly. It was released as a free digital download on DatPiff on October 5, 2013.

Background
The mixtape features production from Statik Selektah, BrandUn DeShay, Cookin' Soul, ESTA, King Carlow (formerly known as Carnage), The Entreproducers, Chuck Strangers, Lee Bannon, Cy Fyre, Backpack, and Chef Gold. The mixtape also features guest appearances from members of Pro Era, Ab-Soul, Chelsea Reject, Buckshot, Phife Dawg, and Erick 'Arc' Elliot. Music videos have been released for "Still the Motto", "Day zZz's", "Ernee", "Eyetalian Frenchip", "Q&A", and "Sup Preme" which was hosted by Complex Magazine.

Track listing

References

2013 mixtape albums
Albums produced by Statik Selektah
Cinematic Music Group albums
Pro Era albums
CJ Fly albums
Albums produced by Fred Warmsley